The Minister of Social Affairs and Health is one of the Finnish Government's ministerial positions. The minister is one of two portfolios associated with the Ministry of Social Affairs and Health; the other one is the Minister of Family Affairs and Social Services.

The Marin Cabinet's incumbent Minister of Social Affairs and Health is Hanna Sarkkinen of the Left Alliance.

The longest serving Ministers of Social Affairs and Health have been Paula Risikko (2,624 days from 2007 to 2014), Liisa Hyssälä (2,595 days from 2003 to 2010), Sinikka Mönkäre (2,355 days from 1995 to 2005), Tyyne Leivo-Larsson (1,836 days from 1948 to 1958) and Eeva Kuuskoski (1,821 days from 1983 to 1992).

References 

Lists of government ministers of Finland